Georgia competed at the 2012 European Athletics Championships held in Helsinki, Finland, between 27 June to 1 July 2012. Five competitors (three men and two women) took part in five events.

Results

Men
Track events

Field events

Women
Field events

References
 

2012
Nations at the 2012 European Athletics Championships